James Busch Orthwein (March 13, 1924 – August 15, 2008) was an American heir and business executive. He also owned the New England Patriots of the National Football League (NFL) from 1992 to 1993. After unsuccessfully attempting to relocate the franchise to his home city of St. Louis, he sold the Patriots to Robert Kraft in 1994.

Life and career
James Busch Orthwein was born on March 13, 1924. His father, Percy Orthwein, was an advertising executive. His mother, Clara Busch, was the granddaughter of Adolphus Busch, the German-born founder of Anheuser-Busch.

Orthwein was educated at the Choate School in Wallingford, Connecticut. He graduated from Washington University in St. Louis.

Career
Orthwein joined his father's advertising firm in 1947. He served as the chairman and chief executive of the D'Arcy Advertising Company from 1970 to 1983. Orthwein took the advertising agency to the global stage, merging with agencies in Detroit and London. In 1985, the St. Louis-based company merged with Benton & Bowles of New York to form D'Arcy Masius Benton & Bowles.

Orthwein served on the board of directors of Anheuser-Busch from 1963 to 2001. In 1997, Orthwein held 1.6 million shares in Anheuser-Busch, more than any other company insider with the exception of his first cousin, chairman and president August Busch III.

Orthwein was a co-founder of Huntleigh Asset Partners, a private investment firm, in 1983. It was later renamed Precise Capital.

Orthwein purchased the New England Patriots from Victor Kiam in 1992, when the latter was facing bankruptcy and owed him millions. The purchase price was $106 million. During his ownership, Orthwein hired Bill Parcells as head coach and oversaw the drafting of first-overall draft pick quarterback Drew Bledsoe, who helped to return the moribund franchise to respectability. He planned to relocate the Patriots franchise to St. Louis, renaming the team the St. Louis Stallions. However, those plans were derailed when Boston paper magnate Robert Kraft, owner of Foxboro Stadium, refused to accept a buyout of the lease. Kraft used his ownership of the stadium to stage a hostile takeover, offering to pay $175 million for the Patriots franchise knowing that Orthwein no longer wanted the team if he could not move it to St. Louis. Although future St. Louis/Los Angeles Rams owner Stan Kroenke offered to buy the team for $200 million and move it to St. Louis, Orthwein would have been saddled with all relocation expenses. He also would have been responsible for any legal expenses as well, and Kraft had already made it clear that he would go to court to enforce the lease. With no other choice, Orthwein accepted Kraft's bid on January 21, 1994.

Personal life and death
One of Orthwein's wives was Romaine Dahlgren Pierce, who had previously married and divorced William Simpson and David Mountbatten, 3rd Marquess of Milford Haven. Orthwein's third wife was Ruth Orthwein; they divorced in the late 1990s. Orthwein died of cancer at his home in Huntleigh, Missouri in 2008.

For 35 years, Orthwein was Master of Foxhounds at Bridlespur Hunt Club and he was a member of the Missouri Horseman's Hall of Fame. He helped raise more than $1-million for horse show related charities.

References

1924 births
2008 deaths
Businesspeople from St. Louis
American corporate directors
New England Patriots owners
New England Patriots executives
Deaths from cancer in Missouri
Choate Rosemary Hall alumni
Washington University in St. Louis alumni
Masters of foxhounds in the United States
American people of German descent
Busch family
Orthwein business family